Ángela Jiménez, alias Lieutenant Ángel (born 1886, Jalapa del Marqués) was a soldadera (woman fighter) during the Mexican Revolution. She performed different duties such as a flag bearer, spy and sometimes cook. She was also an expert in explosives.

Angela left the state of Oaxaca and fought in the center and north of the country with the villaistas and Zapatistas.

Biography 
Jiménez was the daughter of a Zapotec mother and a Spaniard. Some sources indicate that she held a political position in Tehuantepec. Others indicate that it was her father who held that position. 

In 1911, federal soldiers searched her home for rebels and tried to rape her sister, who with a pistol first killed the soldiers and then shot herself. After witnessing this, Ángela Jiménez swore to kill federals. She dressed as a man and called herself Angel.

She joined the Mexican Revolution along with her father and reached the position of lieutenant even though her colleagues knew she was a woman. 

With a gunshot wound, she left the army and emigrated to Texas and then California, where she was one of the founders of the organization "Veterans of the Revolution" in California (1910 – 1920). She was also a defender of Chicano Rights in the United States.

It is believed that her revolutionary life was the model used by Elena Poniatowska to draw the character of Jesusa Palancares in "".

Ángela Jiménez died in 1990.

See also 

 Petra Herrera
 Amelio Robles Ávila

References 

20th-century Mexican women
Mexican revolutionaries
20th-century deaths
1886 births
1990 deaths